Anolis reconditus, the Blue Mountains anole, is a species of lizard in the family Dactyloidae. The species is found in Jamaica.

References

Anoles
Reptiles described in 1959
Endemic fauna of Jamaica
Reptiles of Jamaica
Taxa named by Garth Underwood
Taxa named by Ernest Edward Williams